Samuel George Claflin (born 27 June 1986) is a British actor. After graduating from the London Academy of Music and Dramatic Art in 2009, he began his acting career on television and had his first film role as Philip Swift in Pirates of the Caribbean: On Stranger Tides (2011).

Claflin gained wider recognition for playing Finnick Odair in The Hunger Games film series (2013–2015) and for his starring role in the romantic film Me Before You (2016). He has since starred in the films Adrift (2018) and The Nightingale (2018), and portrayed Oswald Mosley in the television series Peaky Blinders (2019–2022) and Mycroft Holmes in the mystery film Enola Holmes (2020).

Early life
Claflin was born in Ipswich, Suffolk, to Mark, a finance officer, and Sue Claflin (née Clarke), a teaching assistant. He has two older brothers, Benjamin and Daniel, and a younger brother, Joseph (born 1989), who is also an actor. He grew up in Norwich, Norfolk.

As a child, he had an interest in football. He played throughout his childhood until he broke his ankle, an injury that he felt would prevent him from playing professionally. After some persuasion from his parents and a teacher with whom he'd made an impression during his high school play at Costessey High School, he pursued acting.

A member of the Norwich City School of Excellence, in 2003, he took up Performing Arts at Norwich City College. Claflin subsequently graduated from the London Academy of Music and Dramatic Art in 2009.

Career

Claflin made his acting debut in 2010, when he appeared in two television miniseries—in The Pillars of the Earth as Richard and in Any Human Heart as young Logan Mountstuart. In March 2011, he was cast as Thomas in Seventh Son, a film adaptation of The Spook's Apprentice, but was dropped for unknown reasons and was replaced by Ben Barnes. His next appearance came in April 2011, when he portrayed footballer Duncan Edwards in the BBC TV drama United, which was centred on the events of the 1958 Munich air disaster, in which Edwards died as a result of his injuries.

In April 2010, he was cast as Philip Swift, a missionary who falls in love with the mermaid Syrena (portrayed by Àstrid Bergès-Frisbey), in 2011's  Pirates of the Caribbean: On Stranger Tides, the fourth installment of the Pirates of the Caribbean film series. For the film, he received a nomination in the 17th Empire Awards for "Best Male Newcomer." In 2012, he appeared as Jack in the six-episode miniseries White Heat. Later that year, he played a supporting role in the 2012 film Snow White and the Huntsman, as William, Snow White's childhood friend. He received a nomination in the 2012 Teen Choice Awards for the category "Best Movie Breakout". Also in 2012, he was cast in the lead role in Hammer Films' The Quiet Ones, which was filmed in mid-2013 and was released in April 2014.

On 22 August 2012, Lionsgate announced that Claflin had been cast as Finnick Odair in The Hunger Games film series, starting with The Hunger Games: Catching Fire. The director of Catching Fire, Francis Lawrence, stated of Claflin's performance during filming: "Finnick's an interesting character. At first he feels like a bit of a flirt and there's a little bit of sexual tension, but really you kind of fall in love with the guy and you see that there's a real deep emotional side to him. It's one of the reasons I really hired him in the first place was that it's where his character goes in the next couple of stories and I just think he did a fantastic job." The film was released in November 2013 to general acclaim and Claflin's portrayal of Finnick received positive reviews. Claflin reprised the role in The Hunger Games: Mockingjay – Part 1, released in November 2014, and Part 2, released in November 2015.

In February 2013, it was announced that Claflin was cast as Alex in the film adaptation of Cecelia Ahern's novel Where Rainbows End, distributed as Love, Rosie in some territories. The following month, he starred in the TV film Mary and Martha as Ben, which was broadcast by BBC One. He received critical acclaim for his role as Oxford University student Alistair Ryle in the British dramatic thriller The Riot Club with Charlotte O'Sullivan of the London Evening Standard saying "Claflin captures his character's vitriol very well" and Laura Dibdin of Digital Spy saying "Claflin brings intrigue and vulnerability to offset the sense of entitlement thus making Alistair the film's most fascinating character".

In 2016, Claflin reprised his role as William, Snow White's childhood friend, in several scenes of the sequel The Huntsman: Winter's War. The same year, he starred in Me Before You, the film adaptation of the novel of the same name, in which he played William Traynor. Claflin gained further critical acclaim for his role of Captain Stanhope in the war drama Journey's End (2017) and Adrift (2018).

In 2018, Claflin joined the fifth season of the BBC television drama Peaky Blinders, as the British fascist politician Oswald Mosley. He starred in The Corrupted in 2019. In September 2020, he co-starred in the Netflix original film Enola Holmes as Mycroft Holmes, elder brother of the title character.

In 2023, Claflin played Billy Dunne in Daisy Jones & The Six. Based on the book of the same name, it follows the story of a rock band in the 1970s, and premiered on Amazon Prime Video on March 3, 2023.

Personal life
In 2011, Claflin started dating actress Laura Haddock, whom he had met in an audition for My Week with Marilyn. The two married in July 2013 in a private ceremony. They have a son, born in December 2015, and a daughter, born in February 2018. On 20 August 2019, Claflin and Haddock announced their  legal separation.

Filmography

Film

Television

Awards and nominations

References

External links

 
 Sam Claflin at Biography.com

1986 births
21st-century English male actors
Actors from Norfolk
Male actors from Suffolk
Alumni of the London Academy of Music and Dramatic Art
English male film actors
English male television actors
Living people
Actors from Ipswich
Actors from Norwich
People educated at City College Norwich